Ganga Mahal Ghat (Hindi: गंगा महल घाट) is one of the main ghats on the Ganges River in Varanasi. Constructed in 1830 CE by the Narayan dynasty, the ghat is north of Assi Ghat and was originally constructed as an extension to Assi Ghat.

History
The Narayan dynasty, in 1830, constructed a palace by the river Ganga in Varanasi. The palace was called "Ganga Mahal" (Mahal means palace in Hindi). Since the Mahal (palace) was housed on the ghat, the ghat was named "Ganga Mahal Ghat". Stone steps between Assi Ghat and Ganga Mahal Ghat separates the two ghats. This palace houses the design studio of Hemang Agrawal whereas the upper floors are used by the "Indo-Swedish Study Centre" organised by Karlstad University.

Location
Ganga Mahal Ghat is situated on the bank of the Ganges. It is 6 kilometers south-east of Varanasi Junction railway station and 100 meters north of Assi Ghat.

See also
Ghats in Varanasi

References

Ghats in Varanasi